Leonard Ward may refer to:

 Leonard Ward (English cricketer) (1866–1945), English clergyman and cricketer
 Leonard C. Ward (1917–2001), United States Army officer
 Leonard Keith Ward (1879–1964), Australian geologist, public servant and cricketer
Len Ward, player for Keighley Cougars